Dmitri Ivanovich Yermakov (1846 – November 10, 1916) was a Russian Empire photographer known for his series of the Caucasian photographs.

Life and career

Yermakov was born in Tiflis in 1846, the son of the Italian architect Luigi Caribaggio and a Georgian mother of Austrian descent. She remarried the Russian Ermakov whose surname her son Dmitry took. Trained as a military topographer, he took part in the Russo-Turkish War (1877–1878).

As an adult, he operated photographic businesses in Tiflis. He traveled extensively as far as Iran and participated in several archaeological expeditions in the Caucasus, leaving a series of unique photographs. These photographs document the lifestyles, customs and costumes of Russian people in the late 19th-century forming an important ethnographic record of the region and its inhabitants. Thousands of his negatives are now kept at Georgian museums.

Work

See also

 List of Orientalist artists
 List of artistic works with Orientalist influences
 Orientalism

References

External links

1846 births
1916 deaths
Photographers from the Russian Empire
Archaeological photographers
People from the Russian Empire of Italian descent
People from the Russian Empire of Austrian descent
Orientalists from the Russian Empire
Artists from Tbilisi
Russian military personnel of the Russo-Turkish War (1877–1878)